"Found a Cure" is a 1979 single by Ashford & Simpson, from their album, Stay Free. Along with the title track and the song, "Nobody Knows", "Found a Cure" hit number one on the dance/disco chart for two weeks. The tracks replaced Diana Ross's album, The Boss, which was produced by Ashford & Simpson.  "Found a Cure" also crossed over to the soul singles chart where it stayed at number two for three weeks, as well as crossing over to the pop singles chart where it made the Top 40 peaking at number 36.

References

1979 singles
Ashford & Simpson songs
Disco songs
Songs written by Nickolas Ashford
Songs written by Valerie Simpson
1979 songs
Warner Records singles